Guineesine (or guineensine) is an alkaloid isolated from long pepper (Piper longum) and black pepper (Piper nigrum).

Research
Guineensine inhibits the cellular reuptake of anandamide and 2-arachidonoylglycerol in a mouse model (EC50 = 290 nM).   This causes an increase in the activity of the two neurotransmitters which are classified as endogenous cannabinoids.

Guineesine can dose-dependently produce cannabimimetic effects in a mouse model which are indicated by potent catatonic, analgesic, hypo-locomotive and hypo-thermic effects. In addition, the analgesic and catatonic effects were reversed by the cannabinoid receptor type 1 (CB1) inverse agonist rimonabant.

Guineesine is also a monoamine oxidase inhibitor (MAOI) in vitro (IC50 = 139.2 μM).

References 

Alkaloids found in plants
Benzodioxoles
Carboxamides
Monoamine oxidase inhibitors
Cannabinoids
Endocannabinoid reuptake inhibitors

Guineesine(Guineensine) was first isolated,studied and named from Piper guineense Schum and Thonn.[1,2]
1.	OKOGUN, J.I. and Ekong, D.E.U. 1974 Extracts from the Fruits of the Piper guineense. Schum and Thonn. J. Chem. Soc. Perkin Transactions I, 1974, 2195-2198.
2.	Okwute, S.K. OKOGUN, J.I. and Okorie, D.A. 1984 Revised Structure and Synthesis of Piperolein acids; Guineensine and Wisanine from Piper guineense, TETRAHEDRON, 40, 2541-2545.